Amastra is a genus of small air-breathing land snails, terrestrial pulmonate gastropod mollusks in the family Amastridae. 

This genus is endemic to the Hawaiian Islands.

Many of the species in this genus have become extinct in recent times.

Species
Species within the genus Amastra include:
 † Amastra albolabris
 Amastra anthonii W. Newcomb, 1861
 † Amastra cornea
 † Amastra crassilabrum
 Amastra cyclostoma (Baldwin, 1895)
 Amastra cylindrica
 Amastra delicata C. M. Cooke, 1933
 Amastra dwightii C. M. Cooke, 1933
 † Amastra elongata
 † Amastra forbesi
 † Amastra globosa C. M. Cooke, 1933 
 Amastra gulickiana A. Hyatt & H.A. Pilsbry, 1911
 Amastra implicata C. M. Cooke, 1933
 Amastra inopinata C. M. Cooke, 1933
 Amastra juddii C. M. Cooke, 1917
 Amastra kauaiensis (Newcomb, 1860)
 Amastra micans
 Amastra nannodes C. M. Cooke, 1933
 Amastra nubilosa (Mighels, 1845)
 Amastra nucleola (Gould, 1845)
 Amastra obesa (Newcomb, 1853)
 Amastra oswaldi C. M. Cooke, 1933
 † Amastra ovatula C. M. Cooke, 1933 
 † Amastra pellucida
 † Amastra porcus
 Amastra problematica C. M. Cooke, 1933
 † Amastra reticulata
 Amastra rubens (Gould, 1845)
 Amastra rugulosa Pease, 1870
 Amastra spirizona (Quoy & Gaimard, 1825)
 † Amastra subrostrata (L. Pfeiffer, 1859)
 † Amastra subsoror Hyatt & Pilsbry, 1911
 † Amastra tenuispira
 Amastra textilis (Férussac, 1825)
 Amastra tristis (Quoy & Gaimard, 1825)
 † Amastra umbilicata
Taxa inquirenda
 Amastra amboinensis E. A. Smith, 1873 
 Amastra citrea Sykes, 1896 
 Amastra fraterna Sykes, 1896
 Amastra longa Sykes, 1896 
 Amastra villosa Sykes, 1896

References

 Bank, R. A. (2017). Classification of the Recent terrestrial Gastropoda of the World. Last update: July 16th, 2017

External links
 Sykes, E. R. (1900). Fauna Hawaiiensis. University Press, Cambridge. Volume II, Part IV, Mollusca: pp. 271–412, pls 11, 12

 
Amastridae
Taxonomy articles created by Polbot